St Bartholomew's Church, West Witton is a Grade II listed parish church in the Church of England in West Witton, North Yorkshire.

History

The tower of the church dates from the 16th century. The rest was rebuilt in 1875 by John Bownas Atkinson (1807-1874) and William Atkinson (1811-1886), the cost of £1,100 paid for by Lord Bolton. The contractors were Messrs. Mawer and Pearson. It was re-opened by the Bishop of Ripon on 18 August 1875.

St Bartholomew's was featured in the British television series All Creatures Great and Small, in the episode "Cats & Dogs".

Parish status
The church is in a joint parish with
Thornton Rust Mission Room
St Andrew's Church, Aysgarth
St Oswald's Church, Castle Bolton
St Mary's Church, Redmire
St Margaret's Church, Preston-under-Scar
Holy Trinity Church, Wensley

Organ
A pipe organ was built by W.M. Hedgeland. A specification of the organ can be found on the National Pipe Organ Register.

References

West Witton
West Witton